Overseas RUFC is a Maltese rugby club. They currently compete in the Malta Rugby Union Championship.

History
The club was founded in 1946, before disbanding in the 1970s. Then in 1989 the club was re-formed.

External links
 Overseas RUFC

Maltese rugby union teams
Rugby clubs established in 1946
Swieqi